NGC 3260 is an elliptical galaxy in the constellation Antlia. It was discovered on May 2, 1834 by the astronomer John Herschel.

References

Antlia
Elliptical galaxies
3260
18340502
Antlia Cluster
030875